Dancing with the Stars is an Australian light entertainment reality show which originally aired on the Seven Network from 2004 to 2015 and on Network 10 from 2019 to 2020. When it was on the Seven Network, it was broadcast live from the HSV-7 studios (now Global Television studios) in Melbourne; on Network 10 it aired live from Disney Studios Australia in Sydney and Docklands Studios in Melbourne.

The show is based on the British BBC Television series Strictly Come Dancing and is part of BBC Worldwide's international Dancing with the Stars franchise.

The show pairs celebrities with professional ballroom dancers who each week compete against each other in a dance-off to impress a panel of judges and ultimately the viewing public in order to survive potential elimination. Through telephone and SMS voting, viewers vote for the duo they think should remain in the competition. Judges' scores are combined with the viewer votes when determining which duo is eliminated.

History

2004–2015: Seven's original iteration
The show debuted in a short run from October to November 2004, then returned the following February.

The show was a ratings success averaging around 2 million viewers a week nationally during its peak which places the series at number 1 of the entire day.

The logo used for the first seven series of Dancing with the Stars is similar to the logo used by Strictly Come Dancing. The logo used for the eighth series and beyond is similar to that used by the US version of Dancing with the Stars.

The program ended after 15 seasons when the Seven Network announced in October 2016 it would not renew the program, despite previously suggesting a sixteenth season would air in 2017.

2019–2020: 10's iteration
In September 2018, Network 10 announced the series would be revived and hosted by television presenters and former contestants Grant Denyer and Amanda Keller. The revival premiered on 18 February 2019. In October 2019, the series was renewed for a seventeenth season, which premiered on 9 February 2020.

In October 2020, Network 10 announced the revived series would not return in 2021.

2021: Seven's second iteration
In December 2020, Seven announced they have re-gained the rights to the series, and will be bringing the show back with an All-Stars edition in 2021. The series was filmed at the ICC in Sydney during March 2021. The season premiered on 11 April 2021. In March 2023, the series was renewed for a 20th season which is scheduled to air in Q2 of 2023, the season will not be an all-stars.

Cast

Hosts
From seasons 1 to 7 and season 18, entertainment legend Daryl Somers and dancer/actress/television presenter Sonia Kruger were the two primary hosts. For season 8, Somers was replaced by actor Daniel MacPherson, when Somers returned to the Nine network to host the rebooted Hey Hey, It's Saturday. Kruger continued to co-host with MacPherson, until the start of season 12, when she also defected to the Nine network. Kruger was subsequently replaced by former Spice Girl Melanie Brown, who is a former contestant in the American version of the show, in season 5. In 2013, Brown was replaced by Sunrise weather presenter Edwina Bartholomew. In 2015, Shane Bourne replaced Daniel MacPherson as co-host.

It was announced in September 2018 that in 2019, a 16th season would begin. A whole new cast and crew will be involved in a new production with a 'fresh look' with Grant Denyer and Amanda Keller co-hosting.

Key:  Previous   Current

Judges
From seasons 1 to 7, the judging panel consisted of four primary judges: Todd McKenney, Helen Richey, Paul Mercurio and Mark Wilson. At the start of season 8, Mercurio left the judging panel. Before the eleventh season began, Wilson was dumped by the Seven network and replaced by Joshua Horner. McKenney, Richey and Horner have made up the primary judging panel since 2011. Kym Johnson who comes from the American version of the show, and Adam Garcia join the judging panel in 2013. In 2015, Bruno Tonioli, who comes from both British and American versions, replaced Garcia as a judge for the first three weeks before leaving just three judges for the rest of the season.

Ian "Dicko" Dickson and Bruno Tonioli have also appeared as guest judges throughout the series, providing feedback and scores as part of their judging role. Pamela Anderson, Damian Whitewood, Olivia Newton-John and Dame Edna Everage have also appeared as guest judges on the Seven Network series, but providing comments and feedback only.

For season 16, the judging panel consisted of three primary judges: Craig Revel Horwood, Sharna Burgess and Tristan MacManus.

Key:  Previous   Current

Professional partners
Color key:

 Winner
 Runner-up
 Third place
 Celebrity partner was eliminated first for the season
 Celebrity partner withdrew from the competition
 Celebrity partner quit from the competition
 Celebrity partner participating in the competition

Series overview

Dances 
The following are the dances performed by couples on Dancing with the Stars. In addition, each couple in the final round performs a dance of any style or combination of styles of their choosing, called "freestyle".

 These scores have been modified to be out of 30, instead of 40.

Champion of Champions
In late 2005, the winners of series two (Tom Williams) and three (Ada Nicodemou) competed against each other for the title of Champion of Champions. Series one winner Bec Hewitt did not compete as she was pregnant at the time. Ada Nicodemou and her partner Aric Yegudkin won the championship, defeating Tom Williams and his partner, Kym Johnson, based on the judges' scores.

Scoring chart
Red numbers indicate the couples with the lowest score for each week.
Green numbers indicate the couples with the highest score for each week.
 indicates the winning couple.
 indicates the runner-up couple.

Running Order
Individual judges scores in the chart below (given in parentheses) are listed in this order from left to right: Todd McKenney, Helen Richey, Paul Mercurio, Mark Wilson.

Week 1 
Running order

Week 2 
Running order

Highest-scoring celebrities
The scores presented below represent the best overall accumulative average scores the celebrity gained.

 * These celebrities were scored were out of 40 and their marks have been altered to be made out of 30.

Number of perfect scores

The scores presented below represent the perfect scores which the celebrities gained in their original season.

By Professional:

Ratings

See also

 Dancing with the Stars
 Strictly Dancing

References

External links 
 

 
Seven Network original programming
Network 10 original programming
2000s Australian reality television series
2004 Australian television series debuts
2015 Australian television series endings
2019 Australian television series debuts
Television shows set in Melbourne
English-language television shows
Television series by Warner Bros. Television Studios
Television series by Fremantle (company)
Television series by Freehand Productions
Television series by ITV Studios
Australian television series based on British television series
Australian television series revived after cancellation
Dance competition television shows
2010s Australian reality television series
2020s Australian reality television series